The 2018 Monaco Grand Prix (formally known as the Formula 1 Grand Prix de Monaco 2018) was a Formula One motor race that was held on 27 May 2018 at the Circuit de Monaco, a street circuit that runs through the Principality of Monaco. It was the last victory for Daniel Ricciardo until the 2021 Italian Grand Prix.

The race was won by Daniel Ricciardo in Red Bull, with Sebastian Vettel in Ferrari coming second. Lewis Hamilton in Mercedes finished third, maintaining the championship lead over Vettel. Mercedes also led in the Constructors' Championship ahead of Ferrari.

Report

Background

Tyres
The race marked the competitive début of Pirelli's new hypersoft tyre compound.

Chassis updates
Following controversy over the use of winglets above halo-mounted rear view mirrors at the previous round in Spain, the FIA banned the winglets ahead of the race weekend.

Penalties
Romain Grosjean was handed a three-place grid penalty for causing a collision on the opening lap of the Spanish Grand Prix. Max Verstappen received a 5 place grid penalty for an unscheduled gearbox change, and a 10 place grid penalty for use of a third MGU-K, although this made no difference to his starting position, as he already was at the back of the grid.

Practice 
Daniel Ricciardo was fastest across all three practice sessions, improving his time in each successive session. In FP3, Max Verstappen crashed heavily at the Turn 16, meaning his car was damaged beyond repair for qualifying.

Qualifying 
Max Verstappen was unable to compete in qualifying as his mechanics were unable to repair the car in time after a crash in the final practice session. Daniel Ricciardo set a new qualifying lap record to take pole position for the race. Red Bull capped both ends of the grid, Ricciardo starting first and Verstappen starting last. Pierre Gasly made Q3 for the second time, however his teammate, Brendon Hartley, after showing promise with P7 in FP3, qualified in P16 after being held up in traffic as well as being unhappy with the balance in his car.

Race 
Ricciardo led going into the first corner with the top 6 staying in the same order. On lap 28, Ricciardo, still leading the race, complained of a loss of power to the team. Ricciardo was left to manage a wounded car for the remaining 50 laps of the race, with what was later revealed to be an MGU-K failure (giving him 25% less horsepower than usual), and with only six out of eight gears functioning. For the rest of the race he came under pressure from Sebastian Vettel, however due to dirty air and the track being difficult to pass, Vettel was unable to attack Ricciardo. Vettel lost a lot of time after Stoffel Vandoorne, around a lap behind Vettel and Ricciardo, came in between them both after pitting for a second time.

Sergey Sirotkin was given a 10-second stop-go penalty after his tyres were not fitted to the car at the 3 minute signal. On lap 53 Fernando Alonso retired at Sainte-Dévote due to gearbox problems, his first retirement of the 2018 season. A virtual safety car came out on lap 70 when Charles Leclerc's left front brake disc failed just before the Nouvelle Chicane, causing him to crash into the back of Brendon Hartley. Both drivers were forced to retire due to damage. This was the first Monaco Grand Prix since 2009 where a (full) safety car did not make an appearance, although there was a brief virtual safety car period. It was Ricciardo's most recent victory in Formula One until the 2021 Italian Grand Prix.

Post race 
After the race Hamilton and Alonso both complained that this was "one of the most boring races ever"; drivers were lapping several seconds a lap slower than they could have been to conserve tires and avoid making a second pit-stop. Alonso also pointed to the spread out field, "as there were barely any yellow flags or safety cars."

Classification

Qualifying 

Notes
  – Romain Grosjean received a three-place grid penalty for causing a collision in the  previous round.
  – Max Verstappen failed to set a Q1 time within the 107% requirement and was allowed to start the race at the stewards' discretion. He also received a 15-place grid penalty: five places for an unscheduled gearbox change and ten places for use of a third MGU-K.

Race

Notes
  – Charles Leclerc and Brendon Hartley did not finish the Grand Prix, but were classified as they completed more than 90% of the race distance. Although Hartley completed his 70th lap before Leclerc, Hartley is classified behind Leclerc due to a 5-second time penalty for speeding in the pit lane.

Championship standings after the race

Drivers' Championship standings

Constructors' Championship standings

 Note: Only the top five positions are included for both sets of standings.

See also
 2018 Monaco FIA Formula 2 round

References

External links
 Official website

Monaco Grand Prix
Monaco
Monaco Grand Prix
Grand Prix